Belloliva is a genus of sea snails, marine gastropod mollusks in the family Bellolividae.

Species
As of October 2018, the following species are accepted:

 Belloliva alaos Kantor & Bouchet, 2007
 Belloliva apoma Kantor & Bouchet, 2007
 †Belloliva canaliculata Darragh, 2017
 Belloliva dorcas Kantor & Bouchet, 2007
 Belloliva ellenae Kantor & Bouchet, 2007
 Belloliva exquisita (Angas, 1871)
 Belloliva iota Kantor & Bouchet, 2007
 Belloliva leucozona (A. Adams & Angas, 1864)
 Belloliva obeon Kantor & Bouchet, 2007
 Belloliva triticea (Duclos, 1835)
 Belloliva tubulata (Dall, 1889)
Species brought into synonymy
 Belloliva brazieri (Angas, 1877): synonym of Belloliva leucozona (A. Adams & Angas, 1864) 
 Belloliva simplex (Pease, 1868): synonym of Janaoliva simplex (Pease, 1868) accepted as Olivellopsis simplex (Pease, 1868)

References

External links
 Kantor Yu.I., Fedosov A.E., Puillandre N., Bonillo C. & Bouchet P. (2017). Returning to the roots: morphology, molecular phylogeny and classification of the Olivoidea (Gastropoda: Neogastropoda). Zoological Journal of the Linnean Society. 180(3): 493-541

Bellolividae
Gastropod genera